Kailash Chandra Joshi (14 July 1929 – 24 November 2019) was an Indian politician who was the 9th Chief Minister of Madhya Pradesh in 1970s. Later he was a member of Rajya Sabha from Madhya Pradesh (2000-2004), and a member of Lok Sabha (2004-2014) from Bhopal belonging to the Bharatiya Janata Party (BJP). He started his political career with the Bharatiya Jana Sangh, which later morphed into BJP.

Personal life 
He was born in 1929 to Shri Umashankar Joshi & Smt. Rambha Bai Joshi in Hatpipaliya, Dewas. He was married in 1951 to Smt. Tara Joshi having 3 sons & 3 daughters. His son, Deepak Joshi was the MLA for Bagli from 2003-2008 and later, the MLA for Hatpipliya from 2008-2018.

Kailash Joshi died at the age of 90 on 24 November 2019.

Career 
He served six months as the 9th Chief Minister of Madhya Pradesh, from June 1977 to January 1978 as a member of Janata Party. He was MLA for eight consecutive terms from 1962 to 1998 from Bagli constituency of Madhya Pradesh Legislative Assembly as a member of Jana Sangh, briefly Janata Party, and finally BJP.

He was BJP's losing candidate from Rajgarh (Lok Sabha constituency) in February 1998. Later that year, he lost the assembly election from his stronghold of Bagli. He served as member of the Rajya Sabha from 2000 to 2004. He was a member of the Lok Sabha from 2004 to 2014, representing the Bhopal constituency in Madhya Pradesh, as a member of BJP.

References 

|-

External links 
 Information on MPs
 Members of Fourteenth Lok Sabha - Parliament of India website

1929 births
2019 deaths
State cabinet ministers of Madhya Pradesh
Janata Party politicians
Politicians from Bhopal
People from Dewas
People from Dewas district
India MPs 2004–2009
India MPs 2009–2014
Chief Ministers of Madhya Pradesh
Madhya Pradesh MLAs 1977–1980
Lok Sabha members from Madhya Pradesh
Bharatiya Jana Sangh politicians
Leaders of the Opposition in Madhya Pradesh
Chief ministers from Janata Party
Bharatiya Janata Party politicians from Madhya Pradesh
Rajya Sabha members from Madhya Pradesh
Rajya Sabha members from the Bharatiya Janata Party